Ernane is a given name. It may refer to:

 Ernane (footballer, born February 1985), Ernane Rezende Borges Ferreira, Brazilian football left-back
 Ernane (footballer, born May 1985), Ernane Ferreira Cavalheira Campos, Brazilian football attacking midfielder

See also
 Ernani